The 2012–13 Recreativo de Huelva season is the 75th season in club history.

Review and events

Matches

Legend

Segunda División

Copa Del Rey

Squad

Squad, matches played and goals scored

Minutes played

Starting 11

Bookings

Sources

Recreativo de Huelva
Recreativo de Huelva seasons